Health Affairs is a monthly peer-reviewed healthcare journal established in 1981 by John K. Iglehart; since 2014, the editor-in-chief is Alan Weil. It was described by The Washington Post as "the bible of health policy".

Abstracting and indexing 
The journal is indexed and abstracted in PubMed/MEDLINE, EBSCO databases, ProQuest databases, LexisNexis, Current Contents/Health Sciences and Behavioral Sciences, and SwetsWise Online Content.

Narrative Matters 

Narrative Matters is a personal-essay section. It was established in 1999 with Fitzhugh Mullan (George Washington University) as its original editor.

During its history, Narrative Matters has published over 160 policy narratives on a wide range of topics by well-known writers including Julia Alvarez, Alexander McCall Smith, and Abraham Verghese, by distinguished medical professionals and academics, as well as by patients. In 2006, the Johns Hopkins University Press published a selection of essays from Narrative Matters: "Narrative Matters: The Power of the Personal Essay in Health Policy" (eds. Fitzhugh Mullan, Ellen Ficklen, Kyna Rubin).

Since its inception, Narrative Matters has been funded by the W. K. Kellogg Foundation. The Kellogg Foundation also funded several conferences that brought together present and future contributors to Narrative Matters.

References

External links 
 

Health policy journals
Publications established in 1981
English-language journals
Bimonthly journals